HCMM may refer to:
Aden Adde International Airport (ICAO: HCMM)
Heat Capacity Mapping Mission
Honourable Company of Master Mariners